The Oval Office Study is the working office of the president of the United States. Located in the West Wing of the White House, it adjoins the Oval Office, the ceremonial office of the president. The Oval Office Study is one of a suite of rooms accessed from a small corridor outside the Oval Office, which includes the president's private lavatory and dining room.

References

White House
Rooms in the White House